"A New Start" is a two-part episode that serves as the premiere of the Canadian teen drama series Degrassi High. Both parts aired on CBC in Canada on November 6, 1989, and on PBS in the United States on January 13, 1990. The episode was written by Yan Moore and directed by Kit Hood.

In the episode, which sees the characters of Degrassi Junior High now begin high school, Erica Farrell (Angela Deiseach) discovers she is pregnant following a summer romance and experiences the social consequences of having an abortion; she finds herself at odds with her anti-abortion sister, and protesters swarm her outside of an abortion clinic. The sub-plot involves Joey Jeremiah (Pat Mastroianni), Archie "Snake" Simpson (Stefan Brogren) and Derek "Wheels" Wheeler (Neil Hope) being subject to a hazing campaign by Joey's former enemy Dwayne Myers (Darrin Brown). The episode was made in reaction to the abortion debate of the late 1980s. The writers of Degrassi had thought of making an episode on abortion as early as Degrassi Junior High but ultimately avoided it due to the extremely polarizing nature of the topic.

Although the writers predicted it would generate significant controversy, the episode was largely praised for its portrayal of both sides of the abortion debate, and it was regarded as a reaffirmation of Degrassi's status. In the United States, its final scene, in which Erica and Heather fight through a crowd of anti-abortion picketers, was removed entirely by PBS; a decision which angered director Kit Hood.

Plot

Part one 
While getting prepared for their first day at Degrassi High School, Erica Farrell (Angela Deiseach) suddenly becomes sick and runs into a bathroom to vomit as her sister Heather (Maureen Deiseach) expresses her excitement at the new school. At Degrassi High, many of the students from junior high school reunite with each other. As Erica and Heather approach the school, they are met by Christine "Spike" Nelson (Amanda Stepto) and Liz O'Rourke (Cathy Keenan), the former of who is now taking her daughter Emma to a daycare nearby the high school. Although Heather is excited to see them, Erica looks on, emotionless. In school, Grade 10 students Dwayne Myers (Darrin Brown) and his friends Tabi (Michelle Johnson-Murray) and Nick (George Chaker) express their dismay at the influx of the younger students and they decide that "initiation" should be brought back "unofficially". Erica and Heather meet up with Lucy Fernandez (Anais Granofsky) and L.D. (Amanda Cook), where Heather tells them that Erica had a romance over the summer; a camp counselor named Jason. Erica, not amused, says Jason was a jerk and leaves. Heather explains that the two had a fight and broke up before they left the camp and then tells them that Erica lost her virginity to him, despite having only known him for two months. After Joey, Snake and Wheels meet their junior high teacher Ms. Avery (Michelle Goodeve), Dwayne bumps into Joey and then blames him, Snake and Wheels for burning down the school and explains his plans to initiate the three of them despite the school having banned initiation. After noticing Erica's behavior at school, she consoles her back at home and the two decide to buy a pregnancy test. Back at school, Snake is targeted in the initiation He later returns to Joey and Wheels covered in white powder as Joey and Wheels run away. As the twins wait for the pregnancy tests, Erica suggests having an abortion, which Heather disagrees with, telling her abortion is wrong. The results come back and she tests negative. Later at school, Erica says her period is still late and decides to buy another pregnancy test which Heather agrees with. In the halls, Wheels is next for initiation and returns to Joey and Snake in the cafeteria covered in shaving cream. Snake and Wheels tease Joey, who is next. Back at home, Erica awaits her test results.

Part two 
Her results return and Heather jokes she can finally use the washroom. When she is out of sight, Erica appears to be stunned, implying that the test came back positive. Back at the school, Erica and Heather meet Spike and Liz again. Erica asks Spike how horrible it was being pregnant, which Heather feels is an offhand question. Spike explains that she felt like an outcast and had no social life but that she still loved Emma. In communications class, Erica sparks a class debate about abortion, which Spike refuses to participate in, feeling that because it was wrong for her, it did not mean it was wrong in general. Later on, Erica goes to an abortion clinic, where she is swarmed by anti-abortion protesters. She is led inside the clinic by a worker, who explains the procedure to her. Joey continues to hide from the initiation. At home, Erica reveals she lied to Heather about the results of the second test, that she had a third done at the clinic and that she's made an appointment for an abortion. Heather vehemently disagrees and despite Erica pleading her to come with her, a panicked Heather refuses. Joey is later caught and undergoes initiation; while he is being dragged up a ramp while rolling a banana under his nose, the three leave, just as Joey is approached by Mr. Raditch (Dan Woods), who tells Jeremiah that he is the new vice principal, and takes him to his office for a "little chat". After class, Heather pulls Spike aside and asks her if she'd ever thought about having an abortion. Spike says that she did and that she felt it was wrong to have one but clarifies that it was her choice and Erica (who Heather doesn't name) feels it is right for her. Spike tells Heather: "Y'know, it's great to have high ideals and stuff but when you're in that situation, right and wrong, they can get really complicated." Back at the clinic, protesters are still circling outside. This time, Heather is with Erica and the two go together, where they are swarmed (and in Erica's case the second time) by the protesters. As they make it to the top of the stairs, one protester holds up a plastic fetus and the two are led inside by the woman.

Cast 
Credited in order of original broadcast:

Production 
Prior to "A New Start", Degrassi's writers had been reluctant to tackle the subject of abortion. The idea had been toyed around with as far back as Christine "Spike" Nelson's pregnancy in the previous series, but head writer Yan Moore feared it would not go down well; recalling in 1989, he said: "Years ago, when we began doing Degrassi Junior High, I swore I would not do this topic because I didn't see there was any way we could possibly do it." Moore felt that abortion was such a polarizing subject at the time that there was no definitive middle ground. However, after the cast had gotten older, and the producers had done further research, Moore changed his mind, and creators Linda Schuyler and Kit Hood felt that the cast were emotionally mature enough to handle the topic, and that the identical twin characters of Erica and Heather Farrell (Angela and Maureen Deiseach) were perfect for portraying the polarization.

Linda Schuyler said in 1989 that the topic felt appropriate for ushering in the new series as the subject could be further explored throughout the season, stating, "The issue is not over with in this show. There are three or four subplots which show the angst isn't over with. You just can't put something like this at the end of your season - well, you could but I don't think it would be responsible. The issue doesn't stop and start in an hour."

During the series' pre-acting workshops, the actors were given monologues concerning both sides of the issue to read "with conviction". Some of the actors expressed the opposite opinion of their character. Cathy Keenan, who played the anti-abortion Liz O'Rourke, for example, was pro-choice in real life, which co-creator Linda Schuyler commented was a "real stretch" for Keenan. The topic polarized the cast members, with some refusing to say what had been written for them in the script.

As part of the preparation for the episode, Angela Deiseach, who played Erica, visited a real abortion clinic in Toronto. There, she was recognized from the show by anti-abortion protesters. Deiseach then attended a counselling session, with nobody in the room knowing that she was an actress. After the session, Deiseach entered an elevator, where a man called her a "whore".

Principal photography of the two-parter took place in the spring of 1989, wrapping on May 24. Reportedly, to avoid pre-broadcast controversy, the CBC asked the media not to reveal much details of the episode, including the outcome of the storyline.

Release 
"A New Start" premiered in its hour-long form on CBC Television in Canada at 8:30pm, the same time slot as its predecessor, on November 6, 1989, pre-empting the American sitcom Designing Women. In Australia, the first part premiered at 5:30pm on May 15, 1991 on ABC-TV's The Afternoon Show, a day after Degrassi Junior High's series finale, "Bye-Bye, Junior High", with the second part airing the day later.

Reception and legacy 
"A New Start" did not generate the level of controversy that the writers had feared, specifically in the United States. According to Yan Moore, they received no intensely negative reaction except for "the occasional postcard" from a "religious guy [..] telling us we were all going to hell in a handbasket."  The episode garnered generally positive reviews from critics, who praised the handling of the topic of abortion, and generally viewed it as a strong series opener that reaffirmed Degrassi's reputation as a realistic and honest teen drama. Bob Remington, writing for the Edmonton Journal, felt the episode handled the issue of abortion responsibly, portrayed every view point on the subject, and unlike other television series which addressed the same issue, there was no "miscarriage cop-out". Lynne Heffley of the Los Angeles Times declared that the episode still proved Degrassi as being one of the "most gutsiest shows on television". Writing for The Toronto Star, Antonia Zerbisias acclaimed the episode, asserting that it was "a gutsy show, particularly in the light of the current political and emotional climate [of the 1980s]", and singled out the exploration of both sides of the abortion topic. Furthermore, she quipped that if the show was an American prime time show, "the whole thing would turn out to be a hilarious mix-up. We'd have lots of eye-rolling, sophomoric one-liners about burgeoning bellies and then ooops! Turns out the smart alec kid brother merely murdered the bunny for a school science project." Ian Warden of The Canberra Times particularly praised actress Angela Deiseach, whom he felt "exquisitely and touchingly" portrayed Erica, and suggested that the Australian Broadcasting Corporation sell video tapes of the show in their stores, as "no high school, and perhaps no home with pubescent children rattling around it, should be without them".

A mixed review came from The Province'''s Lee Bacchus. While agreeing that the episode continued to demonstrate the show's willingness to tackle contentious social issues, Bacchus felt that it simplified the issue of abortion to "the bumper-sticker level of righteous moralism" and "lofty platitudes". A more negative review came from Toronto Star's Diane Roberts, who stated that the episode was "fundamentally dishonest" in its portrayal of abortion, and that Erica "has no choice at all since she is totally unwilling or unable to look her situation squarely in the face".

In 2022, thirty-three years after its airing, Reader's Digest Canada's Brett Walther ranked the episode and its storyline on his list of "10 Times Degrassi High Was the Best Thing on Television". Like contemporary critics, Walther shared the sentiment that the abortion plotline was "sensitively and intelligently handled", and that the episode still felt "relevant more than three decades on". Walther also singled out a quote from Spike: "It’s great to have, you know, high ideals and stuff, but when you’re in that situation, right and wrong—they can get really complicated.", as being "fantastic" and "could just as easily serve as the series’ manifesto". He concluded that the episode didn't have a happy ending, but rather the moral of the story being that "most people are inherently decent, doing the best they can in a world that’s often unfair."

 PBS scene edit controversy 

Though the episode did not generate the level of controversy the writers had feared, a minor spat occurred between Degrassi High's producers and PBS when the episode made its United States debut on the network in January 1990. The final scene with Erica and Heather fighting through a crowd of anti-abortion protesters to the entrance of the abortion clinic was removed, instead ending on a shot of the twins looking on at the crowd before approaching them. Kate Taylor of WGBH, who was also involved in the series' production, stated that the choice to cut the scenes was an "[a]esthetic decision", that had been undertaken to create a "more powerful, more poignant" ending to the story. The choice was done without the consent of the show's original producers. This drew a negative response from co-creator Kit Hood, who denounced PBS's changes and stated that Kate Taylor had brought a "personal bias" into the decision. Hood also remarked that they had given the episode "an American ending, happy, safe but incomplete...". In protest, he requested his name be taken out of the credits of the PBS version. 

Linda Schuyler noted that the removed portion included a shot of a picketer holding up a plastic fetus, something that would be referred back to in a later episode. Edmonton Journal's Bob Remington defended PBS's decision, arguing that it did not avoid the issue "or take the easy way out" as had been insinuated, and that the producers were overreacting over something arguably minor.

 See also 
 "It's Late", a similar episode from Degrassi Junior High involving teen pregnancy.
 "Accidents Will Happen", a similar episode from Degrassi: The Next Generation'' involving teen pregnancy that was not aired in the United States until three years later.

References 

1989 Canadian television episodes
Television censorship in the United States
Degrassi episodes about teenage pregnancy
Degrassi High episodes
Television episodes about abortion
Television controversies in Canada
Television controversies in the United States